Karczmiska  is a village in Opole Lubelskie County, Lublin Voivodeship, in eastern Poland. It is the seat of the gmina (administrative district) called Gmina Karczmiska.

The village has a population of 800.

References

Karczmiska
Lesser Poland
Lublin Governorate
Lublin Voivodeship (1919–1939)